Jansug Ivanes dze Kakhidze (26 May 1935 — 7 March 2002) was a Georgian musician, composer, singer and conductor nicknamed "the Georgian Karajan". Kakhidze was music director of the Georgian State Symphony Orchestra for two decades beginning in 1973. He is the father of composer and conductor Vakhtang Kakhidze.

Musical career
In 1958, Kakhidze graduated from the Choir Conducting department of the Tbilisi State Conservatory. In 1963 he completed the post-graduate courses for Opera and Symphony Orchestra Conducting under Professor Odysseas Dimitriadis at the same institution. Later he had training in Moscow with the Ukrainian/French conductor Igor Markevitch.

From 1982 until 2002 Djansug Kakhidze was the Artistic Director and Chief Conductor of the Tbilisi Opera and Ballet Theatre. Opera performances released under his direction included Salome, Don Giovanni, Boris Goduno, Il trovatore, Otello, Rigoletto, Cavalleria rusticana, Gianni Schicchi, L'elisir d'amore, The Queen of Spades, The Fiery Angel, The Love for Three Oranges, Duenj, Abesalom and Eteri, and Music for the living.

In 1989, Kakhidze founded a new hall for symphony music in Tbilisi, which included the Tbilisi Center for Music and Culture. He established the first professional boys' choir in Tbilisi at this center in 2000, further developing the classical performing arts in Georgia.

In 1993, Kakhidze founded the new Tbilisi Symphony Orchestra, and led it until his death in 2002.

Noted for his innovative program and devotion to contemporary works from his homeland, Kakhidze gained recognition during his life as a close friend and strong advocate of composer Giya Kancheli, recording his entire cycle of seven symphonies, along with many other works.

Highlights of Kakhidze's career included numerous appearances conducting throughout Europe and Australia. His performance of Berlioz's Damnation of Faust with the Orchestre de Paris in 1990 drew high praise from critics, and helped him to secure further international success in places such as the United States, where appeared as a guest conductor with both the Boston Symphony Orchestra and the National Symphony Orchestra.

Filmography

Composer 
 1974 – The Eccentrics (with Giya Kancheli)
 1974 – Watermelon (Animation film)
 1974 – Ra-Ni-Na (Animation film)
 1974 – Bet (Short film)
 1975 – The first swallow
 1975 – Valse on the Mtatsminda (Short film)
 1976 – Thermometer (Short film)
 1976 – Tree Manetis (Short film)
 1976 – Ivanika and Simonika
 1976 – Trip to Tbilisi
 1977 – Stepmother of Samanishvili (with Giya Kancheli)
 1977 – Racha, my love 
 1978 – Data Tutashkhia (with Bidzina Kvernadze)
 1978 – Kvarkvare
 1980 – Tbilisi, Paris, Tbilisi
 1981 – Open the window
 1984 – The Legend of Suram Fortress
 1993 – Express - Information (with Vakhtang Kakhidze)
 1994 – Iavnana

Voice 
 1974 – Ra-Ni-Na (Animation film)
 1974 – Watermelon (Animation film)

As actor 
 1970 – Once Upon a Time There Was a Singing Blackbird – Conductor
 1996 – Brigands-Chapter VII – Conductor

Selected recordings 
Camille Saint-Saëns, Piano Concerto Nº 2 / Fantasies, Liszt / Rhapsodie, Rachmaninov, Elisso Bolkvadze, piano, Tbillisi Symphony Orchestra, conducted by Jansug Kakhidze. Cascavelle, 2010

Awards 
 Order of the Badge of Honour (1958)
 Shota Rustaveli Prize (1977)
 People's Artist of the Georgian SSR (1978)
 People's Artist of the USSR (1985)
 Order of the Red Banner of Labour

References

External links
 Tbilisi Center for Music and Culture

1935 births
2002 deaths
20th-century classical composers
20th-century conductors (music)
20th-century male singers from Georgia (country)
Musicians from Tbilisi
Tbilisi State Conservatoire alumni
People's Artists of Georgia
People's Artists of the USSR
Recipients of the Order of the Red Banner of Labour
Rustaveli Prize winners
Classical composers from Georgia (country)
Classical musicians from Georgia (country)
Conductors (music) from Georgia (country)
Soviet classical musicians
Soviet conductors (music)
Soviet film score composers
Soviet male classical composers
Soviet male singers
Burials at Didube Pantheon